Søren Pind (born 20 November 1969) is a Danish lawyer and politician, a member of the center-right party Venstre. He served as Danish Minister of Justice from 2015 to 2016, and as Minister of Science, Technology, Information and Higher Education from 2016 to May 2018, where he resigned because he was tired of politics.

Pind was born in Herning. He served as councillor in the Copenhagen City Council from 1994 to 2005, and has taught at the University of Copenhagen.

Pind is considered more liberal than most other members of his party. In 2003, he was part of a group of party members who issued the "ten liberal theses", a document unsuccessfully challenging the direction the party was taking under Prime Minister Anders Fogh Rasmussen.

Political career
He was appointed to the Lars Løkke Rasmussen I Cabinet during a cabinet reshuffle in February 2010, becoming Minister for Development Cooperation. He was appointed Minister for Refugees, Immigrants and Integration on 8 March 2011, thus holding double ministerial office.

Pind's first term as minister ended on October 3. 2011, after the center-left coalition prevailed in the 2011 parliamentary election.

On 28 June 2015 he was appointed as Minister of Justice in the Cabinet of Lars Løkke Rasmussen II.

On 28 November 2016 he was appointed as Minister of Science, Technology, Information and Higher Education in Prime Minister Lars Løkke Rasmussen's Cabinet III.

Other activities
 European Council on Foreign Relations (ECFR), Member

Honours and decorations 
  : Commander (Kommandør) of the Order of the Dannebrog 17 March 2017.
  : Chevalier (Knight) of the Legion of Honour on 12 March 2015.

References

External links
 

1969 births
Living people
Venstre (Denmark) politicians
Government ministers of Denmark
People from Herning Municipality
20th-century Danish lawyers
21st-century Danish lawyers
20th-century Copenhagen City Council members
21st-century Copenhagen City Council members
Danish Justice Ministers
Members of the Folketing 2005–2007
Members of the Folketing 2007–2011
Members of the Folketing 2011–2015
Members of the Folketing 2015–2019